The Miꞌkmaq–Nova Scotia–Canada Tripartite Forum was established in 1997 to provide the Miꞌkmaq, Nova Scotia and Canada a place to resolve issues of mutual concern. The Forum's vision is to develop Mi'kmaw communities and foster positive relationships with other Nova Scotians.

On February 23, 2007, the Miꞌkmaq–Nova Scotia–Canada Framework Agreement was created for the Made-in-Nova Scotia Process. The Framework Agreement confirms each party's commitment to work "to resolve Miꞌkmaq rights issues through negotiation in a spirit of reconciliation."  The intent of the Agreement is to: Enhanced legal clarity on rights issues; Improved relations; and Reduced social and economic disparity.

On August 31, 2010, the Assembly of Nova Scotia Miꞌkmaq Chiefs signed an historic agreement with the Governments of Canada and Nova Scotia. The Miꞌkmaq–Nova Scotia–Canada Consultation Terms of Reference lays out a process for the parties to follow when governments wish to consult with the Miꞌkmaq.

Miꞌkmaw Kinaꞌmatnewey
One of the successes of the Miꞌkmaq–Nova Scotia–Canada Tripartite Forum is the Nova Scotia government and the Miꞌkmaq community have made the Miꞌkmaw Kinaꞌmatnewey, which is the most successful First Nation Education Program in Canada.  In 1982, the first Miꞌkmaq operated school opened in Nova Scotia.  By 1997, all education for Miꞌkmaq on reserves were given the responsibility for their own education.  There are now 11 band run schools in Nova Scotia.  Now Nova Scotia has the highest rate of retention of aboriginal students in schools in the country. More than half the teachers are Miꞌkmaq.  From 2011 to 2012 there was a 25% increase of Miꞌkmaq students going to university.  Atlantic Canada has the highest rate of aboriginal students attending university in the country.

References 

Politics of Nova Scotia
Culture of Nova Scotia
1997 establishments in Nova Scotia
Indigenous organizations in Nova Scotia
Intergovernmental organizations
Diplomatic conferences
Indigenous politics in Canada